YES Prep Southeast is a school in Houston, Texas. The mascot is Wizards.  In 2007, it ranked #40 on Newsweek Magazine's Top 100 High Schools list and it was also ranked #38 by U.S News.

The YES Prep College Preparatory School System which stands for Youth Engaged in Service, was founded in 1998 when Christopher Barbic, now the head of the Achievement School District in Memphis, Texas, grew frustrated as he watched his sixth grade students move on to low-performing intermediate schools. Barbic decided to recruit some of the best teachers he could find and start his own 6-12th grade school. Year after year, student performance on the Texas Assessment of Academic Skills or TAAS test was significantly superior than that of other students in school districts across Texas.

Eventually Barbic obtained a state charter which allowed him to expand the campus into a 6-12th grade school. Eventually the YES Prep School grew into 18 campuses(Southeast, Southwest, North Central, East End, Gulfton, Fifth Ward, North Forest, Brays Oaks,  Northside, Southside, Northbrook Middle, Northbrook High, Hoffman, Eisenhower, North Forest, West, and Northline, and Northwest.) in the Greater Houston Area. All of the schools colors unite with the color Navy. The school colors are yellow, kelly green, orange, blue, silver, maroon, purple, red and dark blue (in order)  The newer schools start off with just one grade level and work off from there gaining more and more students and teachers. It is an academically challenging school which tries to prepare its students for college. Every Spring students go on a trip in the United States for a week where they learn many things and go to visit historic sites or visit colleges and universities.   It has high school and middle school in the same building.  The school director was Keith Derosiers. Now, the school has two new co-directors. Every year the school takes kids that have good grades to other states and sometimes other countries depending on their grade level. It is a very good school for low income families and for kids who really want to go to college.

References

External links
YES College Prep Official Website
YES College Prep in U.S News

Schools in Houston
Public high schools in Texas
Public middle schools in Texas
Charter schools in Texas